Scrobipalpula antiochia is a moth in the family Gelechiidae. It was described by Powell and Povolný in 2001. It is found in North America, where it has been recorded from California.

The larvae feed on Senecio douglasii, within terminal shelters in new foliage.

References

Scrobipalpula
Moths described in 2001